Tai Chi Hero (太極２ 英雄崛起) is a 2012 Hong Kong-Chinese 3D martial arts film directed by Stephen Fung, written and produced by Chen Kuo-fu. It is the sequel to Fung's 2012 film Tai Chi Zero. It was released in Hong Kong on 25 October 2012. It is to be followed by a third  undeveloped movie named Tai Chi Summit.

Synopsis
The continuing adventure of Yang Lu Chan as he bumbles his way through learning Chen-style kung fu.
Which is later named by the Prince as "Tai Chi", henceforth no longer known as just Chen style. Yang Lu Chan evolves from the Bumbling Idiot into the first stage of being the most formidable Tai Chi Master and wins the heart of Chen Yu Niang, daughter of the Chen Grandmaster.

Cast

Yuan Wen Kang as Prince Dun
Jayden Yuan as Yang Lu Chan
Angelababy as Chen Yu Niang
Shu Qi as Mother Yang
Stephen Fung as Nan
Xiong Xin Xin as Uncle Qin
Shen Si as Brother Tofu
Wei Ai Xuan as Zhao Di
Eddie Peng (credited as Eddie Peng Yu-Yen as Fang Zi Jing
Feng Shao Feng as Chen Zai Yang
Wu Di as Chen You Zhi
Chen Si Cheng as Chen Geng Yun
Xiong NaiJing as Chen Geng Yun's wife
Tony Leung Ka Fai as Chen Chang Xing
Feng Tsui Fan as Grand Uncle
Nikki Hsin Ying Hsieh as Jin Yuner
Patrick Tse as 10th Grandmaster
Daniel Wu as Mad Monk
Peter Stormare as Flamming
Ying Da as Governor
Yuen Biao as Li Qiankun

References

External links

2012 films
Hong Kong martial arts films
Films directed by Stephen Fung
2012 3D films
Tai chi films
Hong Kong sequel films
Hong Kong martial arts comedy films
Hong Kong 3D films
IMAX films
Films set in the 19th century
Steampunk films
2012 martial arts films
2010s Hong Kong films